Ambilobeia is an extinct genus of prawn which existed in Ambilobé, Madagascar during the Triassic period. It contains the species Ambilobeia karojoi.

References

Penaeidae
Triassic crustaceans
Prehistoric animals of Madagascar